Suddenly Paradise is a 2003 Italian comedy film directed by Leonardo Pieraccioni.

Cast
Leonardo Pieraccioni as Lorenzo
Angie Cepeda as Amaranta
Alessandro Haber as Taddeo Borromini
Rocco Papaleo as Giandomenico Bardella
Anna Maria Barbera as Nina
Gea Martire as Veronica
Giulia Montanarini as Mirna
Fabrizio Pizzuto as Fausto
Nunzia Schiano as the Fortuneteller

References

External links

2003 films
Films directed by Leonardo Pieraccioni
2000s Italian-language films
2003 comedy films
Italian comedy films
Italian romantic comedy films
2000s Italian films